Scott Brazil (May 12, 1955 – April 17, 2006) was an Emmy and Golden Globe Award-winning American television producer and director.

Early years
Brazil was born in Sacramento County, California. His childhood home was in Sacramento's South Land Park Hills neighborhood. He was a graduate of the University of Southern California where he earned a bachelor of science degree from the Annenberg School of Journalism.

Career
Brazil started his career as an Associate Producer on The White Shadow from 1979-1981.

Hill Street Blues
Brazil began working on Hill Street Blues as an associate producer from 1981-1982. He worked as a producer from 1982-1983, and was the supervising producer from 1983-1986. He won Emmy Awards for Outstanding Drama Series in 1983 and 1984 and a Golden Globe Award in 1983 for his work on Hill Street Blues. He was also nominated for Emmys for that series in both 1985 and 1986 and Golden Globes in 1984 and 1985. He worked in various capacities on 116 of 144 episodes of the show.

The Shield
He worked on The Shield from its premiere in 2002. He directed 11 episodes of the series, more than any other individual. As a producer, he shared in the show's 2003 Golden Globe Award for best drama series. The season premiere of season six was dedicated to his memory.

Other Work
Brazil directed episodes of Grey's Anatomy, JAG (8 episodes),
Nip/Tuck (2 episodes), CSI: Miami, LAX, Buffy the Vampire Slayer, and Nash Bridges. 

Brazil partnered with Larry Garrison, president of Silver Creek Entertainment, producing film and television for 18 years. He produced TV 101, WIOU, Space Rangers, Like Mother, Like Son and Live Shot. He was a co-executive producer of Cracker, Gideon's Crossing and L.A. Doctors. 

Brazil was a member of the Directors Guild of America and the Academy of Television Arts & Sciences.

Personal life and death
Brazil died in Sherman Oaks, California on April 17, 2006, aged 50, of respiratory failure from complications of ALS (Lou Gehrig's disease) and Lyme disease. He was survived by his wife (Marie), daughter (Lindsay) age 15, son (Mark) age 12, his father (David), and brother (Griff).

Posthumous tributes
The last episode of The Kill Point and the first episode of the sixth season of The Shield were dedicated to Brazil. The Season 5 DVD release of The Shield contains a 25-minute tribute to him from cast and crew members.

References

Emmy-winning director Scott Brazil, 50. The Hollywood Reporter
BBC News obituary ("Hill Street Blues producer dies") 20 April 2006

External links

 Retrieved 02-22-2015

1955 births
2006 deaths
American television directors
Television producers from California
Neurological disease deaths in California
Deaths from motor neuron disease
Businesspeople from Sacramento, California
People from Greater Los Angeles
USC Annenberg School for Communication and Journalism alumni
20th-century American businesspeople